Santo Tomás District is one of eight districts of the province Chumbivilcas in Peru.

Geography 
The Wansu mountain range traverses the district. Some of the highest peaks of the district are listed below:

Ethnic groups 
The people in the district are mainly indigenous citizens of Quechua descent. Quechua is the language which the majority of the population (85.05%) learnt to speak in childhood, 14.63% of the residents started speaking using the Spanish language (2007 Peru Census).

See also 
 Chukchu
 Qañawimayu
 Sinqa Wayq'u
 Wamanmarka

References